Angelika Cichocka (born 15 March 1988) is a Polish athlete who specializes in middle-distance running. She won a silver medal in the 800 metres at the 2014 World Indoor Championships, a gold in the 1500 metres at the 2016 European Championships, and a silver for the same event at the 2015 European Indoor Championships.

Cichocka beat Sifan Hassan representing the Netherlands en route her 1500 metres gold at the 2016 European Championships.

International competitions

Personal bests
 800 metres – 1:58.41 (London 2017)
 800 metres indoor – 2:00.37 (Sopot 2014)
 1000 metres – 2:34.84 (Sopot 2016)
 1500 metres – 4:01.61 (Paris 2017)
 1500 metres indoor – 4:06.35 (Düsseldorf 2018)
 Mile – 4:19.58 (London 2017)

References

External links

 

1988 births
Living people
People from Kartuzy
Sportspeople from Pomeranian Voivodeship
Polish female middle-distance runners
World Athletics Championships athletes for Poland
Athletes (track and field) at the 2016 Summer Olympics
Olympic athletes of Poland
European Athletics Championships medalists
21st-century Polish women